This is a list of characters from the Cartoon Network animated television series Foster's Home for Imaginary Friends.

Main characters

Mac 
Mac (voiced by Sean Marquette) is Terrence's younger brother who is a bright and creative eight-year-old boy and Bloo's creator who visits Foster's every day. Mac is often the voice of reason among his friends when they are making decisions. However, his extremely good nature tends to make him somewhat naive. He is very attached to Bloo and it is shown that his biggest fear is never seeing him again, because Bloo is what keeps him happy and cheerful and vice versa. Mac becomes hyperactive to the point of a rabid mania when he eats sugar. Once in this state, he becomes impossible to control, will often become obsessed with seeking any other source of sugar. He, alongside Bloo, made a cameo appearance in The Powerpuff Girls series finale, "The Powerpuff Girls Rule!".

Bloo 
Blooregard "Bloo" Q.  Kazoo (voiced by Keith Ferguson) is Mac's blue and cylinder-domed no. 71 imaginary friend and best friend who is often very immature, self-centered and egotistical as well as having a knack for getting in trouble and prone for doing kid's and children's antics. Despite all this, he still has a good heart and apologizes for his actions. Bloo loves paddle-balls even though he cannot make the ball hit the paddle. His full name is Blooregard Q. Kazoo. He, along with Mac, made a cameo appearance in The Powerpuff Girls series finale, "The Powerpuff Girls Rule!".

Wilt 
Wilt (voiced by Phil LaMarr) – The kind, red, very tall and disabled no. 1 imaginary friend with only a right arm and crooked left eye-stalk. However, in "Good Wilt Hunting", it is discovered that he was not always this way; he was injured during a basketball game, leaving his left eye crushed and his left arm injured. Wilt exhibits consummate good sportsmanship, which he applies to every part of life he can. He is considered the nicest person at Foster's and is known for being excessively polite and apologetic, saying “I’m sorry” all the time. Wilt has a big heart, is frequently cool and collected, and, only on very rare occasions shows anger at all. His oversized basketball shoes always squeak against the floor/ground, no matter what surface he is walking on. According to the episode "Room with a Feud", among him, Coco and Eduardo, he has been in the house for the longest time.

Eduardo 
Eduardo (voiced by Tom Kenny) is the big, hairy and purple Spanish-speaking no. 88 imaginary friend who resembles a mixture of a minotaur and one of the beasts from Maurice Sendak's storybook, Where the Wild Things Are with horns, a snout, a pointy demon-like tail and large teeth. Despite his large size, overwhelming strength, and menacing demeanor, Eduardo is usually docile, but also timid and jumpy as he lacks confidence when he gets frightened, is very compassionate towards all kids (children, preteens, and anyone under the age of 13) and has a somewhat overly sensitive nature, crying at minor negative occurrences, and being scared of almost everything. However, he can be ferocious if angered or in the circumstance that danger befalls his friends although he does not care for others when speaking like that. Eduardo has a fondness for potatoes, dogs, and his cuddly toys. His creator, Nina Valerosa, created him to protect her in a rough neighborhood and is now a police officer.

Coco 
The Coco Bird (voiced by Candi Milo) is the bird-like no. 13 imaginary friend with a palm tree for a head, a crooked red beak and an aeroplane-like body who can only say her name at various speeds and different emphases. A talent unique to her is her ability to lay colorful eggs containing a plethora of objects. Mac, Bloo, Eduardo, Frankie, Wilt, and others usually understand her when she speaks, and often translate for her. Despite her appearance and quirky behavior, she can demonstrate a perceived intelligence, principle and kindness. No one knows who her creator is as she was found on a South Pacific island by two scientists named Adam and Douglas.

Frankie Foster 
Frankie Foster (voiced by Grey DeLisle) is Madame Foster's redheaded 22-year-old granddaughter , addressed as "Miss Frances" by Mr. Herriman. Her parents are never seen in the series. Frankie is the caregiver at Foster's and helps keep everything in order. In spite of Mr. Herriman's fussiness and fixation with rules and cleanliness, she is usually very friendly, outgoing and laid-back. According to her driver's license in "Bus the Two of Us", she was born on July 25, 1984. Frankie is friends with most of the imaginary friends at Foster's (particularly Wilt, Eduardo, Coco, and Bloo) and can be described as a protective big sister to them, but sometimes gets mad at Bloo, Cheese, Madame Foster and Mr. Herriman.

Mr. Herriman 
Mr. H. Herriman (voiced by Tom Kane) is the elderly, anthropomorphic, lop-eared and rabbit-like no. 44 imaginary friend imagined by Madame Foster, who speaks with a British accent, quite similar to Bruce Wayne's butler, Alfred Pennyworth. He wears a tailcoat, white gloves and a top hat, as well as a monocle. He is in charge of the house and is extremely strict about the house rules, but he is also seen to put the rules before common sense, as seen in "Destination: Imagination" when he sticks to the rule written on the chained up toy box of never letting the imaginary friend who is trapped in there out despite what would happen to him if he did not. He is often found punishing Bloo for his various misdemeanors. It was revealed in "Busted" that the reason Mr. Herriman is so hard on Bloo is because he feels that, given that he is allowed to stay at Foster's even though he still has an owner, he has already broken one of the main house rules. He is extremely fond of his creator Madame Foster, harboring great respect and loyalty to her, even at her most prominent levels of unabashed pep and energy.  He has a fear of dogs (due to the fact that dogs are the natural predators of rabbits) and is easily scared out of his wits whenever he comes across one. He also has a rabbit's stereotypical obsession with carrots and will do anything to have them, as demonstrated in "Crime After Crime".

Madame Foster 
Madame F. Foster (voiced by Candi Milo) is the founder of Foster's and grandmother of Frankie. She's an old person but has childlike boundless energy and enjoys herself to fullest. Her imaginary friend is Mr. Herriman, whom she imagined when she was a child and never gave up, and is the only one who can control him. Like Bloo, Madame Foster occasionally becomes hyperactive and mischievous. However, there are times she is shown to be the wisdom of the house.

Recurring characters
 Duchess (voiced by Grey DeLisle) - A banshee-like high-maintenance pedigree imaginary friend who is pompous, ugly, rude, arrogant, selfish and lazy up to the points she orders Frankie to open her eyelids for her first thing in the morning. She considers herself superior to all the other imaginary friends, is extremely negative towards everyone, and never says anything nice. Whenever Duchess turns on the spot, her entire body pivots like a sheet of paper being flipped, revealing that she is two-dimensional. Her full name is "Her Royal Duchess Diamond Persnickety the First, Last, and Only". She speaks with a German accent. Details about Duchess's life before moving to Foster's or who created her remain a mystery since neither Duchess nor her creator were even shown at the reunion in "Good Wilt Hunting".
 Goo (voiced by Grey DeLisle) – A hyperactive, overly imaginative and talkative African-American girl who first appeared in "Go Goo Go". Her parents allowed her to name herself when she was a baby resulting in the full name "Goo Goo Ga Ga". Goo enjoys playing games such as Checkers and Truth or Dare, but she does not know how to play and Mac is the only one who notices. In her first appearance she constantly created friends because she had no real friends because of her odd behavior. She finally stopped making new friends and undoes them after Mac told her to get to know the ones she had made already. However, she has still created a few by mistake or to help on rare occasions. She is also shown to be friends with Cheese, as both of them get along because of their odd doings. Despite appearing older than Mac, her exact age has never been stated.
 Terrence (voiced by Tara Strong) – Mac's older brother and the recurring villain of the series. He enjoys bullying Mac and coming up with various schemes to make Mac's life hard and miserable. His stupidity always gets the better of him, making him easily outsmarted by Mac or Bloo.
 Cheese (voiced by Candi Milo) - The simple, dim-witted and pale yellow no. 0 imaginary friend who debuted in "Mac Daddy". Cheese was thought to be an imaginary friend accidentally created by Mac, but was actually created by Mac's neighbor Louise. He appears to be a nuisance and dim-witted, often saying incoherent or non-sequitur phrases, and breaking into sudden bouts of screaming when frightened or when he does not get his way. Cheese likes goldfish crackers, cereal, juice, chocolate milk (although he is lactose-intolerant), etc.. His real name is "Cheesus". In the series finale "Goodbye to Bloo", he becomes the newest resident at Foster's, much to the other residents' horror.

Recurring Imaginary Friends 
 Fluffer Nutter (voiced by Grey DeLisle)
Fluffer nutter 2 voiced by grey delisle
 Bloppy Pants (voiced by Jeff Bennett)
 Yogi Boo Boo (voiced by Tom Kenny)
 Billy the Squid (voiced by Tom Kenny)
 Sunset Junction (voiced by Keith Ferguson)
 Jackie Khones (voiced by Phil LaMarr)
 Handy (voiced by Keith Ferguson)
 Scissors (voiced by Tom Kenny)
 Uncle Pockets (voiced by Kevin Michael Richardson)

Other characters 
 World (voiced by Max Burkholder): An imaginary friend, and the main and later former antagonist of "Destination: Imagination".
 Red (voiced by Phil LaMarr): Terrence's imaginary friend and rival, who he creates in "Seeing Red". Red refers to himself in third person.
 Ivan (voiced by Kevin McDonald): Created by a blind kid named Stevie with over 100 eyes. He is first seen in "Sight for Sore Eyes".
 Berry (voiced by Grey DeLisle): Has a crush on Bloo, but dislikes how close Mac and Bloo are.

References 

Lists of characters in American television animation
Television characters introduced in 2004
Foster's Home for Imaginary Friends
Cartoon Network Studios characters